Rock butter (also known as stone butter) is a soft mineral substance found oozing from alum slates.

It consists of native alum mixed with clay and oxide of iron, usually in soft masses of a yellowish white colour, occurring in cavities and fissures in argillaceous slate.

Notes

References
 http://dict.die.net/rock%20butter/—has information from Webster's Revised Unabridged Dictionary (1913)
 Rock Butter, from the U.S. Bureau of Mines' Dictionary of Mining, Mineral, and Related Terms (1996), online at the Hacettepe University Department of Mining Engineering website.
 
 

Minerals